Gecko Press is an independent publisher of children’s books based in Wellington, New Zealand. The company was founded in 2005 by Julia Marshall, formerly of Appelberg Publishing Agency, winner of the Storylines Margaret Mahy Medal 2021.

Gecko Press publishes English translations of popular books from countries including France, Taiwan, Sweden, Japan, Germany, Poland and the Netherlands. Gecko Press also publish 2–4 original titles each year.

Authors and illustrators
Gecko Press has published and translated a wide range of children’s book authors and illustrators. These include:
Barbro Lindgren
Dorothée de Monfreid
Eva Eriksson
Frida Nilsson
Gavin Bishop
Gitte Spee
Grégoire Solotareff
Joy Cowley
Kate De Goldi
Margaret Mahy
Michal Shalev
Rose Lagercrantz
Stéphanie Blake
Timo Parvela
Ulf Nilsson
Ulf Stark

Books
Gecko Press publishes fiction and non-fiction books for children. Some of its most successful books to date include: Duck, Death and the Tulip, which has also been adapted as a stage production and short film, and Poo Bum by Stéphanie Blake.

Awards
Since it was established, Gecko Press has been internationally recognised. Prizes include:
2018 – Shortlisted, New Zealand Book Awardsfor Children and Young Adults - The Longest Breakfast
2017 – Best Publisher winner at the New Zealand Book Industry Awards
2017 – Winner, Best Picture book at the New Zealand Book Awards for Children and Young Adults, for That's Not A Hippopotamus!
2016 – Nominated for Marsh Award for Children's Literature in Translation for Detective Gordon: The First Case
2013 – Best Children's Publisher of the Year in Oceania at Bologna Children's Book Fair
2012, 2011 – Finalist, New Zealand Thorpe-Bowker Publisher of the Year
2010 – Runner up, New Zealand Thorpe-Bower Publisher of the Year
2010 – New Zealand Post Children's Book Awards Children's Choice Junior Fiction award for Friends: Snake and Lizard, by Joy Cowley
2010 – Winner Creative Gold Wellington regional business Gold Awards
2009 – Finalist, Wellington regional business Gold Awards
2008 – Winner, New Zealand Thorpe-Bowker Publisher of the Year
2008 – Sunday Star-Times NZ Children's Publisher of the Year
2008 – New Zealand Post Children's Book Awards Book of the Year for Snake and Lizard by Joy Cowley

References

External links
 Official Gecko Press website

Children's book publishers
Publishing companies established in 2005
Book publishing companies of New Zealand
New Zealand companies established in 2005